Divan van Wyk (born 25 February 1985) is a South African first-class cricketer who plays for the Dolphins cricket team. He made his first-class debut for KwaZulu-Natal against Free State at Durban in  October 2004.

References

External links
 

1985 births
Living people
South African cricketers
Dolphins cricketers
Cricketers from Bloemfontein